A tail-sitter, or tailsitter, is a type of VTOL aircraft that takes off and lands on its tail, then tilts horizontally for forward flight.

Originating in the 1920s with the inventor Nikola Tesla, the first aircraft to adopt a tail-sitter configuration were developed by Nazi Germany during the Second World War. Development of such aircraft spiked during the late 1940s and 1950s, as aircraft designers and defence planners alike recognised the potential value of fixed-wing aircraft that could perform both a vertical take-off and vertical landing while also transitioning into and out of conventional flight. Inherent problems with tail-sitter aircraft were poor pilot visibility and control difficulties, especially during vertical descent and landing. Programmes to develop manned tail-sitters were typically terminated in the form of the more practical thrust vectoring approach, as used by aircraft such as the Hawker Siddeley Harrier and Yakovlev Yak-38.

Description 
A tail-sitter sits vertically on its tail for takeoff and landing, then tilts the whole aircraft forward for horizontal flight. This is very different from the many other kinds of VTOL technologies, which have horizontally-oriented fuselages.

Tail-sitters change fuselage orientation after take-off. They start off with the back of the aircraft to the ground (...a vertical orientation), and then reorient to a horizontal orientation in flight.

Some tail-sitters then landed conventionally in horizontally-oriented configuration, while others had a much more ambitious goal of landing vertically with the aircraft's back to the ground, a highly hazardous procedure for many reasons, prime of which was increased fuel consumption and limited pilot visibility.

History

Early work
The concept of a tail-sitting aircraft can be attributed to originate with the inventor Nikola Tesla, who filed for an associated patent during 1928. However, no immediate attempt to implement this concept into a functional aircraft would emerge for almost two decades.

During the Second World War, Nazi Germany worked on the Focke-Wulf Triebflügel (wing-driven) fighter that incorporated the tail-sitter concept into its design. It featured three wings that were mounted radially as a rotor on a rotating section of the fuselage, these were driven by small jet engines positioned on the wingtips to propel the aircraft via this wing rotation. For takeoff and landing, it would fly vertically (akin to a helicopter) before tilting over horizontally to fly as a self-propelled wing generating both lift and thrust. The contemporary Heinkel Lerche project had an annular wing forming a duct around a conventional propeller, and in the transition from vertical to forward flight the lift would have transferred to the wing.

Cold War era
During the 1950s, aircraft designers around the world engaged in programmes to develop fixed-wing aircraft that could not only perform both a vertical take-off and vertical landing, but transition into and out of conventional flight as well. As observed by the aviation author Francis K. Mason, a combat aircraft that possessed such qualities would have effectively eliminate the traditional reliance on relatively vulnerable runways by taking off and landing vertically as opposed to the conventional horizontal approach. Accordingly, the development of viable vertical take-off and landing (VTOL) aircraft was particularly attractive to military planners of the early postwar era. As the thrust-to-weight ratio of turbojet engines increased sufficiently for a single engine be able to lift an aircraft, designers began to investigate ways of maintaining stability while an aircraft was flying in the VTOL stage of flight.

One company that opted to engage in VTOL research was the French engine manufacturer SNECMA who, beginning in 1956, built a series of wingless test rigs called the Atar Volant. Only the first of these was unpiloted and the second flew freely, both stabilized by gas jets on outrigger pipes The third had a tilting seat to allow the pilot to sit upright when the fuselage was level and had the lateral air intakes planned for the free flying aircraft, though it always operated attached to a movable cradle. The pilot for these experiments was Auguste Morel. However, the Atar Volant was not an end onto itself; its long term purpose was to serve as precursors to a larger fixed-wing aircraft. Independently of this work, substantial influence on the direction of development came from the Austrian design engineer Helmut von Zborowski, who had designed an innovative doughnut-shaped annular wing that could function "as power plant, airframe of a flying wing aircraft and drag-reducing housing". It was theorised that such a wing could function as a ramjet engine and propel an aircraft at supersonic speeds, suitable for an interceptor aircraft.

SNECMA's design team decided to integrate this radical annual wing design into their VTOL efforts. Accordingly, from this decision emerged the basic configuration of the C.450 Coléoptère. In December 1958, the Coléoptère first left the ground under its own power, albeit while attached to a gantry. Several challenging flight characteristics were observed, such as the tendency for the aircraft to slowly spin on its axis while in a vertical hover; its pilot also noted that the vertical speed indicator was unrealistic and that the controls were incapable of steering the aircraft with precision while performing the critical landing phase. Dead-stick landings were deemed to be an impossibility. One of aircraft's flights involved a public display of its hover performance before an assembled audience. The eye-catching design of the Coléoptère rapidly made waves in the public conscious, even intentionally; author Jeremy Davis observed that the aircraft had even influenced intentional efforts, having allegedly motived the United States Navy to contract American helicopter manufacturer Kaman Aircraft to design its own annular-wing vehicle, nicknamed the Flying Barrel.

Accordingly, the United States experimented with its own tail-sitters, typically involving propeller-driven design configurations with relatively conventional fixed wings. The Convair XFY Pogo was one such aircraft, featuring a delta wing with cruciform tail configuration; initial test flights were conducted inside of a naval airship hangar at Moffett Field in Mountain View, California. The XFY successfully demonstrated the full transition between flight modes on 5 November 1954. A somewhat similar aircraft was the Lockheed XFV Salmon, which paired a straight wing with an X tail; however, the XFV never achieved the crucial flight transition. However, it became evident during flight testing that such VTOL aircraft would be flown only by the most experienced pilots, even if all technical problems were disregarded; thus, it was not feasible to place VTOL fighters—as previously hoped for—on every ship. Also, whereas jet-engined fighters had top speeds that approached Mach 2, the turboprop VTOL fighter was at a disadvantage due to its maximum speed being below Mach 1. As a result of these circumstances, work on the XFY was halted. During 1955, the United States commenced flight testing of a jet-powered design, the Ryan X-13 Vertijet. Two prototypes were constructed, both of which flew, made successful transitions to and from horizontal flight, and landed. The X-13's final test flight was conducted near Washington DC during 1957.

An inherent problem with all these tail-sitter designs was poor pilot visibility, especially of the ground, during vertical descent and landing. Ultimately, most work on applying the concept towards manned aircraft were abandoned upon the arrival of more practical form of VTOL appeared, in the form of thrust vectoring, as used by production aircraft such as the Hawker Siddeley Harrier and Yakovlev Yak-38. An unmanned aerial vehicle (UAV) does not suffer the problem of pilot attitude. The Dornier Aerodyne is of ducted-fan configuration similar to a coleopter, and a test UAV flew successfully in hover mode in 1972, before development was discontinued. Another contemporary UAV project was the NSRDC BQM-108 that was developed by the United States Navy; although work was discontinued almost immediately after its single successful test flight.

During the 1970s, several studies and wind tunnel models were made of a tail-sitting version of the General Dynamics F-16 Fighting Falcon that was intended for use on board ships; however, it was decided not to pursue further development of the concept due to the large thrust requirement involved, as well as the need for extensive apparatus to handle take-off and landing.

In the present 
At present, most of the tail sitter projects or proposals fall under the category of unmanned aircraft such as Bell Apt or Northrop Grumman Tern.

List of tail-sitters

See also

 Thrust vectoring
 Tiltrotor
 Tiltjet
 Tiltwing
 Coleopter
 VTOL

References

Citations

Bibliography

 Allen, Francis J. "Bolt Upright: Convair's and Lockheed's VTOL fighters". Air Enthusiast (Key Publishing) Volume 127, January/February 2007, pp. 13–20. ISSN 0143-5450.
 Brown, Kevin. "The Plane That Makes Airfields Obsolete." Popular Mechanics, 133(6), June 1970, pp. 80–83.
 
 
 Taylor, John W. R. & Michael J. H. Jane's Pocket Book of Research and Experimental Aircraft. Collier Books: New York, 1977 .
 Wilson, Stewart. Combat Aircraft since 1945. Fyshwick, Australia: Aerospace Publications, 2000. .
 Winchester, Jim. "Lockheed XFV-1 Salmon." Concept Aircraft: Prototypes, X-Planes and Experimental Aircraft. Kent, UK: Grange Books plc., 2005. .

Tailsitter aircraft
Aircraft configurations